Ronald Roy (born 10 December 1956) is an American engineer, physicist, and academic, who is an expert in physical acoustics and its applications to ultrasonics, biomedical acoustics, acousto-optics, cavitation, and bubble swarm acoustics.

Overview
Professor Roy is Head of the Department of Engineering Science (Dean of Engineering) at the University of Oxford. He has served as the Chair Professor of Mechanical Engineering since 2013 and is a Professorial Fellow at Harris Manchester College. Prior to joining Oxford, he spent 17 years as a Professor of Mechanical Engineering at Boston University where, while serving as Department Chair from 2007–2013, he oversaw the successful merger of the former Department of Aerospace and Mechanical Engineering, and the Department of Manufacturing Engineering.  Professor Roy also held posts at the University of Washington’s Applied Physics Laboratory (1991–1996) and the University of Mississippi’s National Center for Physical Acoustics (1988–1991).

Professor Roy is a Fellow of the Acoustical Society of America, and served as the Society’s Vice President in 2016–2017. During 2006–2007, he spent a year at Balliol College (University of Oxford) as the 65th George Eastman Distinguished Visiting Professor. He served on the editorial boards for the Journal of the Acoustical Society of America and IEEE-UFFC and was Editor in Chief of Acoustic Research Letters Online (now JASA-EL). He has engaged industry by way of numerous consultancies and service on directorial and advisory boards, most recently First Light Fusion Ltd., an Oxford spin-out focused on novel technology for fusion energy production.

Education
Professor Roy completed his B.S. degree in Engineering Physics in 1981 at the University of Maine, where he concentrated in electrical engineering. In 1984, he earned his M.S. degree in Physics (with thesis) from the University of Mississippi. In 1985 and 1987, he earned M.Phil and Ph.D. degrees in Engineering and Applied Science from Yale University, where he concentrated in mechanical engineering. In 2006, he was conferred the Oxford MA ad eundem, by special resolution.

Awards and honours

Personal life
Roy is married to Ms Nancy S. Roy. He has 2 children and 1 grandchild.

References

External links
 Ronald Roy homepage
 Ronald Roy on LinkedIn

1956 births
Living people
People from Lewiston, Maine
University of Mississippi alumni
University of Maine alumni
Yale University alumni
American mechanical engineers
Statutory Professors of the University of Oxford
Boston University faculty
University of Washington faculty
University of Mississippi faculty
American expatriates in England
British mechanical engineers
Fellows of Harris Manchester College, Oxford
Fellows of the Acoustical Society of America